"Drowning"  is a song recorded by American singer and songwriter Banks for her debut studio album, Goddess (2014). It was released as the album's third single on June 9, 2014 by Harvest Records. The song was written by Banks and Alexander Shuckburgh, and produced by Tim Anderson and Alexander Shuckburgh.

Composition
During an interview with Noisey, Banks stated that the lyrics were inspired by her best friend. Chris DeVille from Stereogum described the song as "an angry fist-wave from a woman scorned." Robin Murray from Clash Music defined the song's production and the singer's vocals as "a sultry, smoky effort from the singer, with BANKS delivering one of her most seductive vocal performances to date."

Music video
The music video for "Drowning" was directed by Mike Piscitelli. It was released on Banks's Vevo channel on June 5, 2014. The video features Banks slinking through a room full of mirrors and lightbulbs. In the video Banks wears the same outfit in signature colors of black, red, and white respectively.

Charts

References

External links 
 

2014 singles
2014 songs
Banks (singer) songs
Harvest Records singles
Songs written by Al Shux
Song recordings produced by Al Shux
Songs written by Banks (singer)